Chen Tongzhou (born 16 October 1979) is a Chinese boxer. He competed in the men's lightweight event at the 2004 Summer Olympics.

References

1979 births
Living people
Chinese male boxers
Olympic boxers of China
Boxers at the 2004 Summer Olympics
Place of birth missing (living people)
Asian Games medalists in boxing
Boxers at the 2002 Asian Games
Asian Games bronze medalists for China
Medalists at the 2002 Asian Games
Featherweight boxers
Sportspeople from Wenzhou